This timeline of online dating services also includes broader events related to technology-assisted dating (not just online dating). Where there are similar services, only major ones or the first of its kind are listed.

Dominance of online dating

A 2017 survey tracked the change in how Americans meet their spouses and romantic partners since 1940. The results showed a steep increase in the proportion of couples whose first interaction occurred through online media.

See also
Comparison of online dating services

References

Online dating services